Fatherland Union is a translated name for:

Pro Patria Union, a defunct political party in Estonia
Homeland Union – Lithuanian Christian Democrats, a political party in Lithuania
Patriotic Union, a political party in Liechtenstein

See also: Fatherland